Abgah may refer to:
 Abgah, Khuzestan